The commune of Rugombo is a commune of Cibitoke Province in north-western Burundi. The capital lies at Rugombo.

References

Communes of Burundi
Cibitoke Province